Andrew Maynard Parker (born 21 March 1952) is a British rock drummer best known as a founding member and drummer of the hard rock/heavy metal band, UFO.

Parker was born in Cheshunt, Hertfordshire, England. He began drumming when he was 7 years old. He purchased his first drum kit in 1965. By 1969 he and friend Steve Casey had formed Aurora Borealis, a blues band. In mid-1969 he met Phil Mogg, Pete Way and Mick Bolton, who had a band called Hocus Pocus and were looking for a new drummer. Parker auditioned and got the job. Soon after, the band renamed, becoming UFO.

UFO signed with the Beacon Records label. Parker was unable to sign the contract at the time, as he was only 17. His parents refused to sign for him, and he had to wait until his 18th birthday to sign. Later, as UFO was gaining momentum, Parker and Mogg started having "run-ins" with Bolton and fired him shortly after. Parker, Mogg, and Way then needed a guitarist and recruited German future virtuoso Michael Schenker. The group disbanded in 1983, then re-formed two years later without Parker. He rejoined UFO in 1993. He had medical problems between late 2005 and early 2007, and his spot in UFO was briefly filled by Jason Bonham, until his medical issues were taken care of.

He lives, together with his wife, in Granbury, Texas.

References

External links

 Mr Parker Rocks

1952 births
Living people
People from Cheshunt
English rock drummers
English heavy metal drummers
UFO (band) members
Musicians from Hertfordshire
British emigrants to the United States
People from Granbury, Texas
Waysted members